Nikolaus Burggraf und Graf zu Dohna-Schlodien (5 April 1879 – 21 August 1956) was a German naval officer and author.

Biography 
Nikolaus zu Dohna-Schlodien was born in Mallmitz (today Małomice, Poland) to Alfred zu Dohna-Schlodien (1849–1907) and Margarethe née von der Hagen (1845–1932).

Dohna-Schlodien joined the German Imperial Navy in 1896, became a Second Lieutenant in 1899 and First Lieutenant in 1902.

World War I 

In 1915, after the outbreak of World War I, the banana freighter Pungo of the F. Laeisz line was reconstructed as a minelayer and armed merchantman, renamed SMS Mowe, and placed under Dohna's command. A motion picture was made in 1917 about Dohna's exploits, and he was appointed naval adjutant to the German emperor, Wilhelm II.

Later life 
After World War I Dohna-Schlodien commanded a Freikorps in the Silesian Uprisings and retired from the Navy in 1919. He worked as a merchant in Hamburg and moved to Baierbach in the 1930s, where he died in 1956.

Hilde had one daughter, Marion von Laffert, and Nikolaus and Hilde had two additional daughters together, Hildegarde and Margaret.

Dohna-Schlodien was well remembered and respected by British naval officers.  He always made sure to rescue every last survivor of any ships that he had sunk.  When the Allies had invaded the Bavarian area, the Dohna-Schlodien family were treated with respect. Special instructions had been given by Allied generals to not interfere with the family and to allow them to remain in their home unfettered during the invasion.

Decorations and awards
Nikolaus Graf Dohna-Schlodien was one of only two German officers of the First World War who received the highest military awards of the five main German states (the other German officer was Karl August Nerger):
 Pour le Mérite (Prussia)
 Military Order of Max Joseph (Bavaria)
 Military Order of St. Henry (Saxony)
 Military Merit Order (Württemberg)
 Military Karl-Friedrich Merit Order (Baden)
 Iron Cross of 1914, 1st and 2nd class

Publications 
 S. M. S. Möwe. Perthes, Gotha 1916
 Der Möwe zweite Fahrt. Perthes, Gotha 1917
 Der Möwe Fahrten und Abenteuer. Erzählt von ihrem Kommandanten. Perthes, Stuttgart 1927 (Republication of 1916 und 1917)

References

External links 
 the story of SMS Möwe

Notes 

1879 births
1956 deaths
People from the Province of Silesia
People from Żagań County
Recipients of the Pour le Mérite (military class)
Knights of the Military Order of Max Joseph
Counts of Germany
German military writers
Imperial German Navy personnel of World War I
German male non-fiction writers
20th-century Freikorps personnel